The Merry Monarch is an 1890 comic opera that debuted at the Broadway Theatre in New York City.  It is an English adaptation of the L'étoile with a book by J. Cheever Goodwin and new music by Woolson Morse.

History
Presented by actor-manager Francis Wilson and his company, which also featured Marie Jansen, The Merry Monarch debuted on August 18, 1890, and ran for 49 performances, through October 4. Though this was not considered a long run for the time, the show was turning large profits, and crowds were being turned away from every performance. The New York Times reported on September 29 that the play was sure to gross at least $87,000 during the run, "the largest amount by many thousands ever taken at the theatre in the same period at regular prices."  But the theatre had other contractual engagements that prevented a longer run, and it was announced that the production would return the following fall. The play immediately went on the road, also playing to packed houses.  The play returned after the long run of Wang concluded, and ran from October 5 through December 26, 1891, for 84 more performances.  On the second run, a young Lulu Glaser served as the understudy for star Marie Jansen.  It may have run longer, but Wilson was anxious to bring out his next play The Lion Tamer, which immediately followed.

The stage manager for the production was Richard Barker, and costume designs were by Percy Anderson.  Scenery was by Homer Emmons, Henry E. Hoyt, and Plaisted, and the orchestra conducted by Signore A. De Novellis

Another English adaptation of L'étoile played at London's Savoy Theatre, called The Lucky Star, with a score rewritten by Ivan Caryll and new lyrics by Aubrey Hopwood.

Original Broadway cast
King Anso IV by Francis Wilson
Siroco, by Charles Plunkett
Herisson by Gilbert Clayton
Kedas by Harry MacDonough
Tapioca by Willet Seaman
High Chamberlain by M.F. Joslyn
Lilita by Laura Moore
Aloes by Nettie Lyford
Oasis by Cecile Essing
Idra by Belle Hartz
Lazuli by Marie Jansen

References

External links

Photographs of Marie Jansen in the Merry Monarch, Museum of the City of New York
Still, Mary Helen. The Artist and the Entertainers: Emmanuel Chabrier and His Imitators, Masters Thesis, University of Georgia (2013)

1890 musicals
Adaptations of works by French writers
Broadway musicals